Alessandra Keller (born 27 January 1996) is a Swiss mountain biker competing in cross country.

Keller was born in 1996. She lives in the municipality of Ennetbürgen in the canton of Nidwalden.

Alongside Jolanda Neff, she won the 2016 Swiss Epic, a mountain bike stage race. Aged 22 and still eligible to compete in the U23 category, she won the world cup race in Vallnord, Andorra, Short Track Cross-Country race in the elite class. In the cross country, she won the 2018 World Championship in the U23.

Keller has been Swiss cross-country champion four times: 2012 in the U17 category, 2013 in the U19 category, 2018 in the U23 category, and in 2022 in the elite class. She won silver at the 2022 MTB short track world championships in Les Gets, France, behind Pauline Ferrand-Prévot.

Major results

Cyclo-cross

2021–2022
 1st  National Championships
 1st Meilen
2022–2023
 1st  National Championships
 Swiss Cup
2nd Hittnau

Mountain bike

2013
 1st  Cross-country, UCI World Junior Championships
 1st  Cross-country, National Junior Championships
 UCI Junior XCO World Cup
1st Vallnord
 3rd  Cross-country, UEC European Junior Championships
2014
 1st  Cross-country, UEC European Junior Championships
2015
 2nd Cross-country, National Under-23 Championships
 UCI Under-23 XCO World Cup
2nd Albstadt
2nd Val di Sole
2016
 1st  Overall Swiss Epic (with Jolanda Neff)
 3rd  Cross-country, UCI World Under-23 Championships
2017
 Swiss Bike Cup
1st Lugano
3rd Gränichen
3rd Basel
 2nd  Cross-country, UEC European Under-23 Championships
2018
 1st  Cross-country, UCI World Under-23 Championships
 1st  Cross-country, National Under-23 Championships
 UCI XCC World Cup
1st Vallnord
3rd Val di Sole
 Swiss Bike Cup
1st Monte Tamaro
1st Schaan
2nd Solothurn
2nd Gränichen
2nd Lugano
 3rd Overall Swiss Epic (with Kathrin Stirnemann)
2019
 Swiss Bike Cup
1st Monte Tamaro
2nd Basel
 UCI XCC World Cup
2nd Vallnord
2020
 Swiss Bike Cup
2nd Gstaad
2021
 2nd Cross-country, National Championships
 Swiss Bike Cup
2nd Savognin
2022
 1st  Cross-country, National Championships
 1st  Overall UCI XCO World Cup
1st Snowshoe
3rd Lenzerheide
 1st  Overall UCI XCC World Cup
1st Vallnord
2nd Lenzerheide
3rd Mont-Sainte-Anne
3rd Val di Sole
 Swiss Bike Cup
1st Gstaad
 2nd  Short track, UCI World Championships
 Copa Catalana Internacional
2nd Banyoles

References

1996 births
Living people
Swiss female cyclists
Cross-country mountain bikers
Sportspeople from Nidwalden
21st-century Swiss women